The Philippine Basketball Association (PBA) Most Improved Player award is awarded to the player who showed marked improvement in his game year-on-year.

Winners

References

Most Improved Player
Most improved awards
Awards established in 1983
1983 establishments in the Philippines